iMelody is a non-polyphonic ringtone exchange object format, used for mobile phones [Extension: .imy], defined by Ericsson and Sony Ericsson together with other manufacturers and is based on Ericsson's proprietary eMelody format. This ringtone format also supports codes that can control the vibration motor, backlight, LED lights and volume of the device.  The iMelody format was made because the eMelody had some musical limitations.

Transferring melody to mobile phones 
In order to transfer these ringtones to a mobile phone, one can simply send an SMS message with the iMelody/eMelody text as the text of the message, or make a plain text file containing the iMelody/eMelody text, using the extension of either .imy for iMelody or .emy for eMelody, and transfer the file to the mobile phone by Bluetooth, IrDA (infrared), or by a data cable. The file could also be attached to an MMS message or an e-mail message.

iMelody 
MIME: "text/x-iMelody" or "audio/iMelody"

Extension: ".imy"

Here is an example of an advanced ringtone in the iMelody format, this is a silent ringtone that only makes the phone's vibrating motor vibrate constantly:
 BEGIN:IMELODY
 VERSION:1.2
 FORMAT:CLASS1.0
 BEAT:25
 MELODY:vibeonr2vibeonr2vibeon (r2vibeonvibeonr2vibeonr2vibeonr2vibeonr2vibeonr2vibeonr2vibeonr2vibeonr2vibeonr2vibeonr2vibeonr2vibeonr2vibeonr2vibeonr2vibeonr2vibeonr2ledonr2vibeonr2vibeon
 END:IMELODY

Another example of an advanced ringtone, which makes the vibrating motor vibrate constantly, the backlight of the phone's display blink and plays a simple tone:
 BEGIN:IMELODY
 VERSION:1.2
 FORMAT:CLASS1.0
 BEAT:900
 STYLE:S1
 MELODY:(vibeonbackoff*6c5ledon*6d5ledoff*6e5ledon*6f5ledoff*6g5ledon*6a5ledoff*6b5ledon*6a5ledoff*6g5*6f5*6e5*6d5*6c5backon*6d5*6e5*6f5*6g5*6a5*6b5*6a5*6g5*6f5*6e5*6d5@0)
 END:IMELODY

eMelody 
MIME: "text/x-eMelody" or "audio/e-melody"

Extension: ".emy"

Here is an example of a ringtone in eMelody format:
 BEGIN:EMELODY
 VERSION:1.0
 NAME:Test melody 1
 COMPOSER:John Smith
 MELODY:+f+a+fa(b)bdcC+GA+d+#c+dfg+daea+d+#c+e+f+e+fa(b)bdC+EA+d+#c+dfgba+d+#C
 END:EMELODY

External links 
Specification (non official page)
iMelody format
iMelody Maker

References 

Computer file formats
Mobile telecommunications standards
Musical notation